Tracey Lynn Livermore, known professionally as Brandi Love, is an American pornographic actress. She is a member of the AVN and XRCO Halls of Fame.

Early life
Love was born in Dearborn, Michigan and raised in Plymouth, Michigan. She attended Central Michigan University. She is the great granddaughter of stock trader Jesse Livermore. She is married to Chris Potoski and they live in Wake Forest, North Carolina with their daughter.

Career
Love started her own amateur pornography website in 2003.
In 2006, she and husband Chris Potoski collaborated with Falcon Foto to form Naked Rhino Media, a multimedia company creating niche pornographic content.
In 2013, it was announced that Kelly Madison Media was developing a new website for Love and would take part in the production of new content.

In 2008 Love released her book, Getting Wild Sex from Your Conservative Woman, and appeared on an episode of Penn & Teller: Bullshit! titled "The War on Porn". 
Throughout her career as an adult film performer, she became known for her appearances in MILF and hot wife–themed productions.

Politics
Love is a self-described conservative and Republican who supported Donald Trump and "voted for Bill Clinton back in the day". She has written articles for The Federalist, a conservative online magazine.

In July 2021, Love was expelled from a Florida conference by the conservative student organization Turning Point USA after attending several panels. Conservatives, following a group of white nationalists known as Groypers, denounced Love being admitted to a conference with minors, while Federalist co-founder Ben Domenech criticized the ban. Love denounced the ban as an example of "cancel culture".
She later told Newsweek that she would support a presidential campaign by Florida governor Ron DeSantis in 2024 if Trump declined to run again.

Publications

Awards

References

Further reading

External links

 
 
 
 

21st-century American women writers
Actors from Raleigh, North Carolina
American pornographic film actresses
American women in business
Living people
North Carolina Republicans
People from Dearborn, Michigan
Pornographic film actors from North Carolina
Year of birth missing (living people)